Haji Shahzad is an Indian politician from Uttarakhand and a three term Member of the Uttarakhand Legislative Assembly. Shahzad represented the Bahadarabad Assembly constituency in the 1st Uttarakhand Assembly, 2nd Uttarakhand Assembly and Laksar Assembly constituency in the 5th Uttarakhand legislative Assembly.

Positions held

References

External links
 

Living people
Year of birth missing (living people)
20th-century Indian politicians
Bahujan Samaj Party politicians from Uttarakhand
People from Haridwar district
Uttarakhand MLAs 2022–2027
Uttarakhand MLAs 2002–2007
Uttarakhand MLAs 2007–2012